The WIPO Hague System provides an international mechanism for securing and managing design rights simultaneously, in multiple countries and regions, through one application filed directly with WIPO. The resulting international registration provides design owners with the equivalent of a bundle of national or regional registrations. The subsequent management of that international registration – including modifications, updates and renewals – is a single step procedure through WIPO.

Geographical coverage 
The Hague System comprises 77 contracting parties, covering more than 90 countries, including all countries of the European Union (EU) and the African Intellectual Property Organization (OAPI). Hague System users can designate as few or as many of these contracting parties as they wish when filing an international application.

According to the rules laid out by the Hague Agreement, anyone who is a national of – or who has a domicile, habitual residence or real and effective industrial or commercial establishment in – any one of the Hague System's contracting parties (including any country of the EU or OAPI) can use the Hague System. There is no pre-requirement to file a national or regional design application.

History 
The origins of the Hague System date back to 1925 and the adoption of the Hague Agreement Concerning the International Deposit of Industrial Designs . The Hague Agreement was revised in 1934 (London Act) and again in 1960 (Hague Act). An Additional Act signed in Monaco in 1961, and a Complementary Act signed in Stockholm in 1967 (further amended in 1979) supplement The Hague Agreement.

The London Act (1934) – frozen on January 1, 2010 – terminated on October 18, 2016 . It is no longer possible to file international applications under this Act. It is however currently still possible to renew or modify an international registration recorded under this Act, up to the date of maximum duration of protection provided for – fifteen years. All activity under the London Act (1934) will terminate at the latest on December 31, 2024.

The latest Act of the Hague Agreement is the Geneva Act (1999) – signed on July 2, 1999 – which came into effect on December 23, 2003. Both the Geneva Act (1999) and the Hague Act (1960) – two independent acts of the Hague Agreement – are in force. Operations take place almost entirely under the Geneva Act (1999).

The Geneva Act is open to all WIPO member states and any intergovernmental organization (IGO) that has:

 at least one member that is also a member of WIPO; and
 an office through which design protection may be obtained, with effect in the territory in which the IGO's constituting treaty applies.

The Geneva Act:

 extends membership to countries with intellectual property (IP) offices that carry out novelty examination of designs;
 ensures the international registration system's compatibility with regional systems; and
 offers more features and increased geographical scope.

Common Regulations and Administrative Instructions complement the two Acts of the Hague Agreement that are in force.

Using the Hague System 
International design applications are filed directly through WIPO, according to the requirements and procedures established by the Hague Agreement. The domestic legal framework of each designated contracting party governs the design protection provided by the resulting international registrations.

The Hague System procedure

Filing an international application 
Through the Hague System, applicants file one international application directly with WIPO – in one language and paying in one currency (Swiss francs). They can designate as few or as many of the Hague System's contracting parties as they wish, based on their target markets.

One international application can include up to 100 different designs so long as they belong to the same class of the Locarno Classification – the international classification used for the purposes of registering designs. An international application must contain at least one reproduction (drawing, photo or other graphic representation) of each design included. At least one contracting party must be designated.

Applicants may file an international application online using eHague – the Hague System's online gateway to international design protection. Applications must be filed in English, French or Spanish – the official languages of the Hague System.

Applicants can time publication of their designs to fit their business strategy. Standard publication takes place twelve months after the date of international registration (normally the filing date – the date on which WIPO received the application). Alternatively, immediate publication or publication at a chosen time within 30 months from the filing date (or earliest priority date) may be requested – depending on the domestic laws of the individual designated contracting parties.

Formality examination by WIPO 
WIPO checks each international application to ensure that it complies with formal requirements  (necessary information for applicant / representative, quality of reproductions, payment of fees, etc.).

 If the application does not meet the necessary requirements, WIPO sends the applicant an irregularity letter explaining what is missing or faulty. The applicant has three months to fix those irregularities. Beyond this deadline, the application is no longer valid.
 If the application meets all necessary requirements, WIPO records the registration in the International Register and publishes it in the International Designs Bulletin, according to the publication schedule indicated in the international application. WIPO also sends the holder a certificate of international registration.

International Designs Bulletin 
The International Designs Bulletin – released weekly – is the Hague System's official publication of international registrations, containing all data and reproductions of the designs covered in those registrations. It also provides details on renewals of, and decisions and changes pertaining to those registrations. It is the official data reference for the holders of international registrations, the IP offices of the designated contracting parties and the public at large.

Substantive examination 
Once WIPO has published the international registration in the International Designs Bulletin, the IP office of each designated contracting party may perform substantive examination, checking for example the novelty of the design(s).

Each contracting party has the right to refuse the effects of the international registration within its own territory, if it does not meet the substantive requirements of its own domestic law. Refusals cannot be based on formality requirements. Refusal by one contracting party is limited to its own territory and does not affect the international registration in other designated jurisdictions.

WIPO must be notified of any refusal within six (or twelve) months of the date of publication in the International Designs Bulletin. WIPO informs the holder of the registration, who may then take remedial action. Holders must contest refusals at the domestic level, according to the established procedures of the IP office concerned.

In the absence of a refusal, protection is considered granted in a given jurisdiction, under its domestic laws. Some IP offices, though not obliged to do so, issue a Statement of Grant of Protection after completion of substantive examination. When a holder successfully challenges a refusal, the IP office of the contracting party in question must withdraw the refusal, or issue a Statement of Grant of Protection.

Managing international registrations 
Holders can make changes to their international registrations such as updating contact details, making changes to ownership, appointing representatives, requesting renunciation or limitation. International registrations are managed centrally through WIPO meaning that changes automatically apply to all designated contracting parties – except in the case of limitation or renunciation.

Holders make all changes using official Hague System forms. WIPO records the modifications in the International Register and publishes them in the International Designs Bulletin.

Renewing international registrations 
The initial period of protection provided by the Hague System is five years. It is possible to renew an international registration twice. If the legislation of an individual contracting party allows for a longer duration of protection, then this also applies to international registrations.

Holders can renew their registrations online directly through WIPO's eHague platform for as many of the designs included, and in as many of the designated contracting parties, as desired.

Statistics

2021 data 
Statistical data released in 2022 show that the number of designs contained in international applications grew by 20.8% in 2021 to reach 22,480 designs – the fastest growth since 2010. For the fifth consecutive year, Samsung Electronics (Republic of Korea) headed the list of top filers.

2020 data 
Statistical data released in 2021 reveal that – with 5,792 international applications filed in 2020 – the Hague System showed some resilience in 2021 in the face of COVID-19; only 1.7% fewer applications compared to the previous year.

WIPO recorded 6,795 international registrations in 2020, representing a 34.8% increase on 2019.

In 2020, some 44,100 international registrations were in force, providing protection to approximately 172,200 designs.

References 

Intellectual property law
Industrial design